Güneyli may refer to:

Güneyli, Erdemli, Turkey
Güneyli, Gelibolu
Güneyli, Jalilabad, Azerbaijan

See also
 Güneli, Nusaybin, Mardin Province, Turkey
 Günəşli (disambiguation)